Tatyana Nikolaevna Ovechkina (maiden name: Kabayeva; born 19 March 1950) is a former Soviet Russian basketball player who played for a national team that won two Olympic gold medals, the 1975 World Championships and six European Championships. Today, she runs the Russia women's national basketball program.

Early life
Ovechkina was born in Moscow, Soviet Union. At age 7, she was walking home from school when an automobile struck her and mangled her right leg. She spent a year in the hospital recovering.

Career
At 16, Tatyana joined Dynamo Moscow's women's basketball team and soon became its star. At age 19, she was named team captain and played in the club for 13 more years.

Ovechkina won two Olympic gold medals with the USSR team, in 1976 and 1980, and never lost a game in an official international competition. She also won the 1975 World Championship, six European Championships (1970, 1972, 1974, 1976, 1978, 1980), and the 1977 Summer Universiade. She retired from the national team at age 30.

She was awarded the Order of the Badge of Honor in 1976 and the Order of Friendship of Peoples in 1980. In recent years, she was overwhelmingly chosen the 20th century's best female point guard by the readers of the Sport-Express, an Eastern European daily newspaper. Currently, she is a candidate for induction into the FIBA Hall of Fame.

Personal life
Ovechkina is the mother of professional ice hockey winger Alexander Ovechkin, who plays in the National Hockey League (NHL) for the Washington Capitals. He was selected 1st overall in the 2004 NHL Entry Draft. He won the Hart Trophy as the league's most valuable player in 2008, 2009 and 2013. Alexander won a Stanley Cup with the Capitals in 2018. He currently has the second most goals in NHL history (809). Alex wears #8 in honor of Tatyana, who wore #8 during her basketball career.

References 

1950 births
Living people
Russian women's basketball players
Dynamo sports society athletes
Basketball players at the 1976 Summer Olympics
Basketball players at the 1980 Summer Olympics
Honoured Masters of Sport of the USSR
Medalists at the 1976 Summer Olympics
Medalists at the 1980 Summer Olympics
Mordvin people
Basketball players from Moscow
Olympic basketball players of the Soviet Union
Olympic gold medalists for the Soviet Union
Olympic medalists in basketball
Recipients of the Order of Friendship of Peoples
Soviet women's basketball players